Ceylania ceylonica is a species of beetle in the family Cerambycidae, and the type species of its genus. It was described by Stephan von Breuning in 1979. It is known from Sri Lanka.

References

Gyaritini
Beetles described in 1979